Mallen is an English-language surname. 

Mallén is a municipality located in the province of Zaragoza, Aragon, Spain

Mallen or the accented Mallén may refer to:

People
Given name
Mallen Baker (born 1963), English expert on corporate social responsibility and a former politician

Surname
 Amalia Mallén, Cuban essayist, translator, suffragist, and feminist activist
 Charles Mallen (1819–1909), South Australian brewer
 Jim Mallen (1881–1954), Canadian ice hockey player
 Ken Mallen (1884–1930), Canadian ice hockey player
 Mary Mallen, American actress and singer

Fiction
The Mallen Novels by Catherine Cookson
 The Mallen Streak (1973)
 The Mallen Girl (1974)
 The Mallen Litter (1974)

The Mallens, a British television adaptation of the Catherine Cookson novels

Sports
CD Mallén, a Spanish football team based in Mallén

See also
 Juan Montón y Mallén (c. 1730 – December 1781, in Segovia), Spanish composer and maestro de capilla of Segovia Cathedral
 Mallam (disambiguation)